A One Day International (ODI) is an international cricket match between two representative teams, each having ODI status, as determined by the International Cricket Council (ICC). An ODI differs from Test matches in that the number of overs per team is limited, and that each team has only one innings. , 41 players have represented the Hong Kong national team in ODIs, since its debut in 2004. Many of these players are of South Asian origin, a demographic which comprises only a small fraction of the overall population of Hong Kong.

Hong Kong gained ODI status in its own right following the 2014 World Cup Qualifier, but had previously been accorded ODI status twice on a temporary basis, when it participated in the Asia Cup.  The team's first ODI came against Bangladesh in the 2004 Asia Cup, with the team then playing one further match in that competition, against Pakistan.  At the 2008 Asia Cup, Hong Kong again played two matches, against Pakistan and India, although it lost heavily in all matches played. After gaining full ODI status in 2014, the team's first matches in that format came in the 2014 ACC Premier League tournament, against Afghanistan and the United Arab Emirates (UAE). Hong Kong did not win an ODI until its tenth match, in November 2015, when it defeated the UAE by 89 runs as part of the World Cricket League Championship.

Hong Kong lost their ODI status in March 2018 after finishing 10th and last in the 2018 Cricket World Cup Qualifier. They did, however, play two further ODI matches at the 2018 Asia Cup in September 2018 after winning the 2018 Asia Cup Qualifier, as the ICC announced that all matches played at the finals would have ODI status.
This list includes all players who have played at least one ODI match and is initially arranged in the order of debut appearance. Where more than one player won their first cap in the same match, those players are initially listed alphabetically at the time of debut.

Key

List of players

Last updated 18 September 2018.

Notes:
1 Mark Chapman also played ODI cricket for New Zealand. Only his records for Hong Kong are given above.

See also

One Day International
Hong Kong national cricket team
List of Hong Kong Twenty20 International cricketers

Notes

References

Hong Kong ODI
ODI